Captain Harold Albert Kullberg (10 September 1896 – 5 August 1924) was a World War I flying ace credited with 19 aerial victories. Though he scored his victories with the Royal Air Force, Kullberg was an American citizen. He was rejected for training as an American pilot because he was too short. He then joined the Royal Flying Corps in Canada on 7 August 1917.

Biography
He was born on 10 September 1896 in Somerville, Massachusetts.

He joined No. 1 Squadron RAF in May 1918. He was an immediate success flying the RAF SE.5a, scoring pairs of victories on 27 and 28 May, 1 and 9 June. His next victory, his ninth, was over an observation balloon. He continued scoring apace through June and July. August and September brought his final five victories, all over German Fokker D.VIIs. The wingmen of his final victory on 16 September 1918 pursued him and inflicted three leg wounds on him. Kullberg sat out the rest of the war. It took six months for Kullberg to heal. He served until his release from service in July 1919.

Kullberg became involved in civil aviation. He even made the nation's first arrest for violation of air traffic rules. On 3 November 1923, Kullberg chased down someone who was stunt flying over an urban area, landed with them, and arrested them.

He became president of the Akron Aeronautical Association.

On 5 August 1924, he died in an air crash while instructing a student pilot.

Honors and awards
Distinguished Flying Cross (DFC)

"This officer has destroyed six enemy aeroplanes and has taken part in seven engagements when others have been destroyed by members of his patrol. A bold and keen officer who possesses a fine fighting spirit." DFC citation, London Gazette, November 2, 1918.

See also

 List of World War I flying aces from the United States

References

External links

1896 births
1924 deaths
American World War I flying aces
Aviators from Massachusetts
Aviators killed in aviation accidents or incidents in the United States
Recipients of the Distinguished Flying Cross (United Kingdom)
Victims of aviation accidents or incidents in 1924
Military personnel from Massachusetts